SpaceWire is a spacecraft communication network based in part on the IEEE 1355 standard of communications.  It is coordinated by the European Space Agency (ESA) in collaboration with international space agencies including NASA, JAXA, and RKA.

Within a SpaceWire network the nodes are connected through low-cost, low-latency, full-duplex, point-to-point serial links, and packet switching wormhole routing routers. SpaceWire covers two (physical and data-link) of the seven layers of the OSI model for communications.

Architecture

Physical layer
SpaceWire's modulation and data formats generally follow the data strobe encoding - differential ended signaling (DS-DE) part of the IEEE Std 1355-1995.  SpaceWire utilizes asynchronous communication and allows speeds between 2 Mbit/s and 200 Mbit/s, with initial signalling rate of 10Mbit/s. DS-DE is well-favored because it describes modulation, bit formats, routing, flow control, and error detection in hardware, with little need for software.  SpaceWire also has very low error rates, deterministic system behavior, and relatively simple digital electronics.  SpaceWire replaced old PECL differential drivers in the physical layer of IEEE 1355 DS-DE by low-voltage differential signaling (LVDS). SpaceWire also proposes the use of space-qualified 9-pin connectors.

SpaceWire and IEEE 1355 DS-DE allows for a wider set of speeds for data transmission, and some new features for automatic failover. The fail-over features let data find alternate routes, so a spacecraft can have multiple data buses, and be made fault-tolerant. SpaceWire also allows the propagation of time interrupts over SpaceWire links, eliminating the need for separate time discretes.

Link layer 
Each transferred character starts with a parity bit and a data-control flag bit. If data-control flag is a 0-bit, an 8-bit LSB character follows. Otherwise one of the control codes, including end of packet (EOP).

Network layer 
The network data frames look as follows:

One or more address bytes are used for the routing. Addresses are either physical ones (0-31), or logical ones. The difference is that the physical addresses are deleted from the frame header during routing - which is used for hop-based routing (based on path specified in the frame itself). Logical addresses may be deleted as well, depending on the router configuration.

Interconnection
The hardware devices may be connected either directly, or via a SpaceWire router. In the former case, usually pairs of devices are used to guarantee a fail-safe operation - which is however handled by the software.

A SpaceWire router is usually a crossbar switch-type device, operating in wormhole switching mode. This also may limit the speed of the communication to the lowest common speed. The routing decisions are based on the programmed routing table and the initial incoming frame contents.

Uses
SpaceWire is used all around the globe.
Its use began primarily in ESA projects, but it is currently used by NASA, JAXA, RKA, and many other organizations and companies.  Some NASA projects using it include the James Webb Space Telescope, Swift's Burst Alert Telescope, the Lunar Reconnaissance Orbiter, LCROSS, the Geostationary Operational Environmental Satellite (GOES-R), and the SCaN Testbed, previously known as the Communications, Navigation, and Networking Reconfigurable Testbed (CoNNeCT). It has also been selected by the United States Department of Defense for Operationally Responsive Space.  SpaceWire initiatives are being coordinated between several Space Agencies in the frame of CCSDS in order to extend its communication model to the Network and Transport Layers of the OSI model.

SpaceWire supports highly fault-tolerant networks and systems, which is one reason for its popularity.

Protocols 
The ESA has a draft specification in place for the Protocol ID.

The following Protocol ID's have been assigned in ECSS-E-ST-50-11:

References

Other sources
ECSS-E-ST-50-12C - SpaceWire - Links, nodes, routers, and networks, ESA-ESTEC.
ECSS-E-50-12A (SUPERSEDED only document number has been changed to ECSS-E-ST-50-12C) SpaceWire - Nodes, links, and networks, ESA-ESTEC.
ECSS-E-ST-50-11C Draft 1.3 "Space engineering - SpaceWire protocols"

External links

SpaceWire Homepage (ESA)
European Cooperation for Space Standardisation - ECSS
4Links Publications
International SpaceWire Conference 2007
International SpaceWire Conference 2008
International SpaceWire Conference 2010
International SpaceWire Conference 2011
 International SpaceWire Conference 2013
STAR-Dundee Knowledge Database
http://www.interfacebus.com/SpaceWire_Avionics_Bus.html
Commercial providers of SpaceWire equipment:
Spacewire Management software
STAR-Dundee
Spacewire.fr
Aeroflex
Aeroflex Gaisler
 Astrium
Microchip
Aurelia Microelettronica
Ingespace
Dynamic Engineering
4Links
SKYLAB Industries
RUAG Space
PnP Innovations
TELETEL SA
TTTech - Gateway for SpaceWire to 1GbE Ethernet, with Leon-2FT CPU
SpaceWire IP Cores:
4Links
STAR-Dundee
Aeroflex Gaisler
 Astrium SpaceWire RMAP
CEA IRFU
CESR CNRS IRAP (CeCILL-C license)
NASA Goddard - tech transfer
OpenCores.org (SpaceWire and SpaceWire Light)
SpaceWire UK
European Space Agency
PnP Innovations

Articles:
NASA article on SpaceWire used on James Webb Space Telescope

Computer buses
ECSS standards
Fault-tolerant computer systems
James Webb Space Telescope